Jacqui Naidoo is an Australian cricketer who plays as a right-arm medium bowler. She last played for Western Australia in the Women's National Cricket League (WNCL).

Domestic career
Naidoo made her debut for Western Australia on 27 February 2022, against South Australia in the WNCL. She played one more match for the side that season, also against South Australia two days later, and took her first List A wicket.

References

External links

Living people
Date of birth missing (living people)
Year of birth missing (living people)
Place of birth missing (living people)
Australian women cricketers
Western Australia women cricketers